Ja'i is an Indonesian dance used in Sa'o Ngaza rites to express gratitude and excitement. The dance is usually displayed in the middle of the village; site as a sacred place of worship. Ja'i dance has the characteristics and uses little space in the form of rows and performed repeatedly. As a communal dance, the beauty and allure of Ja'i lies in uniformity, and the energy of the dancers.

Music instrument
Music instruments that used to accompany the Ja'i dance is five gong and three tambur.

See also

 Sigale gale

References

Dances of Indonesia